Brettina Lorena Robinson (born December 8, 1970) is a Bahamian jazz singer-songwriter, model, and SAG actress, who lives in metropolitan Los Angeles.

Early life 
Brettina was born in Nassau, the Bahamas. She moved to Chicago with her family while she was a toddler when her mother, gospel-singer/actress Leona Coakley Spring, began acting on the popular stage plays "The Crucible," and "The Other Cinderella." Brettina moved back to the Bahamas during her school years.

Brettina began singing at age four, under the influence of her mother, as well as her uncles
 , Theo and Kirk Coakley of the popular 1970 Funk/Soul group T-Connection.

While attending C.I. Gibson School in the Bahamas she was awarded the title "Miss C.I. Gibson", which made her eligible for Miss Bahamas Talented Teen. Brettina won the title "Miss Bahamas Talented Teen", and earned a university scholarship. She attended the University of Washington.

Musical style and career

Brettina cites as her main influences Nancy Wilson, Sarah Vaughan, Shirley Horn, Shirley Bassey, Sade, Adele, Diana Krall, Brenda Russell, Corinne Bailey Rae, Tiwa Savage and LIRA. She sings jazz, and describes her style as "organic".

She hopes to perform in South Africa where she has a huge following, and to capture the European audience.

She draws from personal experience in her songwriting. For example, she cites her poor childhood as the inspiration for her song "Poor Old Times", her fondness for chai as the inspiration for "Chai", and childhood memories as the inspiration for covering the Belafonte-Burgess song "Island in the Sun".

In addition to her jazz career, she has worked as a print model and an actress in national advertisements. As a singer, she has performed mainly in the Seattle and Los Angeles areas.

She has performed in public on several occasions, for example:
 CD release party (publicity appearance, but not a performance) 
 Supermodel of the Bahamas show, with Bahamian R&B singer Julien
 Kirkland Performance Center "New Face of Jazz" concert November 2010
 "Up Close & Unplugged" concert January 26, 2011
 Her talent agency announced a "New Face of Jazz World Tour".
 Caribbean Heritage Organization featured artist June 2013
 Scheduled to appear at 20/50 Music Is Life Festival 2014, in Nassau Bahamas, may 8

Awards
 Brettina won the title Miss C.I. Gibson, which made her eligible for Miss Talented Teen Bahamas.
 Brettina won the Hal Jackson Miss Talented Teen Bahamas and was awarded a scholarship.
 Brettina is an Ambassador for the reputable hair brand – Black Velvet Hair

Critical acclaim
Brettina has been praised by a variety of critics, for example:
 All About Jazz, "Brettina"
 Jazz Wax, "Brettina: New Sound of Jazz" 
 Bohemian Soul, untitled article

Philanthropy
Brettina supports several charitable causes, most visibly a donation in support of C.I. Gibson School, which she attended. She also supports All Saints Camp, a shelter for people suffering from HIV/AIDS, with her mother.

Discography
Studio albums: Brettina - Self titled debut album (2010), New Day - EP released in 2021.
 Brettina (2010) 
 "Paradise"
 "Bahamian Girl"
 "The Bug"
 "Serafina"
 "Poor Old Times"
 "Chai"
 "My Time to Shine"
 "Pardon the Storm"
 "Island in the Sun"
 "One"
 "Serafina" (bonus track with strings)
Bop Baiyé - Single released in 2019.
New Day - EP released in 2021.
"New Day"
"Low"
"Simple Pleasures"
"Bop Baiyé"
Simple Pleasures Remixes - Released in 2022.
"Simple Pleasures (Incognito Radio Edit)"
"Simple Pleasures (Incognito Mix)"
"Simple Pleasures (IYakul Remix)"
"Simple Pleasures (Ski Oakenfull Dub)"

Videos 
"Simple Pleasures" Original Version (Lyric Video) released on the Brettina Official YouTube channel in 2020.
"Bop Baiyé" music video reported to currently be in production and scheduled for release in 2022.

Management 
Brettina is currently working with the UK based firm "Nick Stewart & Associates Ltd", an independent consultancy launched by music industry veteran Nick Stewart, who signed U2, Killing Joke and The Long Ryders to Island Records and has worked with a wide range of world renowned artists such as Grace Jones, Fleetwood Mac, Neil Diamond, Robert Palmer, Michael Bolton and New Kids On The Block.

References

External links
 
 

1976 births
Living people
Bahamian emigrants to the United States
Bahamian singers
People from Nassau, Bahamas